Thomas Stoddart (28 November 1953 – 17 November 2021) was a British photojournalist. He covered the fall of the Berlin Wall, the Lebanese Civil War, the siege of Sarajevo and the 2003 invasion of Iraq.

Life and career 
Stoddart was born in Morpeth, Northumberland in November 1953. He began his career covering local news for the Berwick Advertiser, Northumberland and John Pick's Yorkshire Press agency, York. He continued his work as a photojournalist based in London and from there covered national and international stories including the fall of the Berlin Wall, the Lebanese Civil War, the siege of Sarajevo and the 2003 invasion of Iraq.

Stoddart died from cancer on 17 November 2021, at the age of 67.

Publications 
Sarajevo. Washington: Smithsonian, 1998. . With an essay by Predrag Matvejevic.
IWitness. London: Trolley, 2004. .
Extraordinary Women: Images of Courage, Endurance & Defiance . Woodbridge, Suffolk: ACC Art, 2020. . With a foreword by Angelina Jolie.

Awards 
2003: Winner, Pictures of the Year International World Understanding Award, for work on HIV/AIDS in sub-Saharan Africa
2003: Winner, Larry Burrows Award for Exceptional War Photography, for coverage of British forces fighting in Iraq
2008: Shortlisted, Taylor Wessing Photographic Portrait Prize, for "Murdoch Reflects"

Exhibitions

Solo exhibitions 
Tom Stoddart – Extraordinary Women, Side Gallery, Newcastle, 2020/21

Exhibitions with one other
Edge of Madness – Sarajevo a City and Its People Under Siege, Royal Festival Hall, London, 1997. Work by Stoddart and Alastair Thain.

References

External links 
 

People from Morpeth, Northumberland
1953 births
2021 deaths
English photojournalists
Deaths from cancer